The Sensitive Sound of Dionne Warwick is the fourth album by the American singer Dionne Warwick, released on February 15, 1965 by the Scepter label. It was produced by Burt Bacharach and Hal David, with Bacharach also arranging the songs.

History
The album is notable for including the singles "Who Can I Turn To" and "You Can Have Him". It also featured a rendition of the standard "Unchained Melody", the song The Righteous Brothers were to take into the Top 10 later the same year. The album was digitally remastered and reissued on CD on November 29, 2011, by Collectables Records.

Track listing

Charts

References

External links
The Sensitive Sound of Dionne Warwick at Discogs

Dionne Warwick albums
1965 albums
albums arranged by Burt Bacharach
Albums produced by Burt Bacharach
Albums produced by Hal David
Scepter Records albums